The Hiwan Homestead Museum is a historic house museum in Evergreen, Colorado.

It is located at 4208 S. Timbervale Drive in Evergreen.

History
The property was purchased in the late 1880s by Mary Neosho Bailey Williams, widow of General Thomas Williams. The only structure on the property at the time was a hay barn, which Mary and her daughter Josepha hired local carpenter John "Jock" Spence to convert into a three-room cabin, finished in 1893. They named the property Camp Neosho, after Mary's middle name.

After Mary passed away in 1914, the Douglases contracted Jock Spence to expand the house to a total of seventeen rooms. The expansion was completed in 1918. The house remained in the ownership of the Williams-Douglas family until Josepha's passing in 1938. The house was sold to the Buchanan family, which used the building as the headquarters for Hiwan Ranch, and their descendants who lived in the home until 1973.

In 1974, Jefferson County purchased the property, marking the first usage of county Open Space funds in the area. The county commissioners asked the Evergreen Mountain Area Historical Society (then the Jefferson County Historical Society) to supply volunteers to provide tours, exhibits and educational programs for the museum, which opened to the public on August 3, 1975. Heritage Grove, a four-acre parcel adjacent to the property, was purchased separately in 1977. 

Jeffco Public Schools students visit the museum as part of the fourth grade Colorado history unit, an optional field trip program which began in 1976.

Architecture
The Rocky Mountain rustic style log building utilizes local pine, fir, and granite. Its architectural features are described in its National Register of Historic Places nomination:

Other structures built by Jock Spence in the area include the Church of the Transfiguration chapel (c. 1900, moved to its current site in 1961), the Evans–Elbert Ranch residence (1908), the Bell Tower at Church of the Transfiguration (1911), the Anne Evans Mountain Home (1911), Greystone Lodge (1917), and Center Stage (1924, originally the Evergreen Conference Meeting House).

References

External links
Hiwan Heritage Park
Evergreen Mountain Area Historical Society

Historic house museums in Colorado
Houses completed in 1893
Museums in Jefferson County, Colorado
National Register of Historic Places in Jefferson County, Colorado
Rustic architecture in Colorado